Shin Seok-jung was a Korean poet. He was born in 1907 in Buan, North Jeolla Province.
After graduating from Buan public school, he went to Seoul and studied Buddhist texts for about a year in Gangwon Province, the predecessor of Dongguk University. 
In 1931, he began his career as a member of the 'Simunhak'(hangul:시문학, The meaning of 'poetic literature', a monthly magazine specializing in poetry).
He established a unique position by publishing an idyllic poetry. He served as a schoolteacher at Buan Middle School and Jeonju High School. 
In July 1976, Shin Seok-Jeong's Tombstone was constructed in Jeonju Deokjin Park.

Works list
Candlelight (1939)
Flowering Shrubs (1946)
A Sad Pastoral (1947)
Glacier (1956)
Do You Know That Faraway Land? (2020)

See also
Seokjeong Literary Museum
Buan County

References

External links 
  

Korean male poets
Literature of Korea under Japanese rule
1907 births
1974 deaths
20th-century Korean poets
Yeongsan Shin clan
Dongguk University alumni
20th-century male writers